The Calanque de Sugiton is one of the numerous Calanques located between Marseille and Cassis, France.

While quite small, Sugiton is perhaps the most known of all Marseille Calanques, simply because it can be easily accessed by hikers, starting from Luminy University Campus, and because it is open to tourists even during hot season, unlike most Calanques. In fact, during summer most of the Calanques are closed because of high fire risk.

A small beach can be found at the extremity of the calanque.

External links 
A satellite view of Calanque de Sugiton
Hiking and visiting the Calanque de Sugiton

Landforms of Provence-Alpes-Côte d'Azur
Cliffs of Metropolitan France
Massif des Calanques